The Forum for the Restoration of Democracy–People, commonly known as Ford People, was a political party in Kenya.

History
The party was established in October 1997 pur! as a breakaway from Ford–Asili. In the 2002 general elections, the party won 14 out of 210 elected seats in the National Assembly, whilst in the presidential contest, the party supported Simeon Nyachae, who came third with 5.9% and thats on period.

In the 2007 general elections, Ford-Kenya was part of the newly created Party of National Unity led by President Mwai Kibaki. It gained three seats in parliament, but became the first to have a parliamentary seat victory overturned in an election petition, when the result for the Bomachoge Constituency was annulled.

In 2016 the party merged into the Jubilee Party.

References

Defunct political parties in Kenya
Political parties established in 1997
1997 establishments in Kenya
Political parties disestablished in 2016
2016 disestablishments in Kenya